The fall-front desk can be considered the cousin of the secretary desk.  Both have a main working surface or desktop that does double duty as a cover to seal up papers and other items located in small shelves or small drawers placed one on top of the other in front of the user.  Thus, all working papers, documents and other items have to be stored before the desk is closed.

Unlike the secretary desk, the fall-front desk's desktop panel is perfectly vertical when in its closed position. Often, there are no additional shelves or drawers above the section that is enclosed by the desktop.  Thus, the fall-front desk is identical in shape to a Bargueño desk, which would have been placed on a stand of drawers, or more precisely to the form known as desk on a chest or as "chest-on chest".

The fall-front desk is also called a drop-front desk, and sometimes also a drop-lid desk.  Scrutoire and scriptoire are ancient variations.  The "secrétaire à abattant" is a nearly identical form, but usually in a French style such as Louis XV, Art Deco, etc. In the early 19th century, Shaker communities produced a tall and plain variation that is often known as a "cupboard desk".

See also
List of desk forms and types.

References

Aronson, Joseph.  The Encyclopedia of Furniture. 3rd ed. New York:  Crown Publishers, 1966.
Boyce, Charles.  Dictionary of Furniture.  2nd ed. New York: Roundtable Press Book, 2001.
Charron, Andy. Desks: Outstanding Projects from America's Best Craftsmen. Taunton press, 2000. pp. 88–107.
Gloag, John. A Complete Dictionary of Furniture.  Woodstock, N.Y. : Overlook Press, 1991.
Moser,Thomas.  Measured Shop Drawings for American Furniture.  New York:  Sterling Publishing Inc., 1985.
Romand, Didier. L'argus des meubles.  Paris:  Balland, 1976.
Souchal, Genevieve.  French  Eighteenth Century Furniture.  Translated by Simon Watson Taylor.  London:  Weidenfeld and Nicolson, 1963.

External links

Desks